Turkish pop singer Murat Boz's discography consists of four studio albums, one compilation album, one EP, eight singles and four duet single. Boz was born in Zonguldak and started his music career in 2001. He worked as a backing vocalist for Tarkan for 5 years. In 2006, he made his debut by releasing the single "Aşkı Bulamam Ben". In 2007, his first studio album, Maximum, was released. The album's lead single topped Turkey's official music charts. This was the first time that his name appeared on music charts inside Turkey. The following year, he released his first EP, titled Uçurum. His second studio album, Şans, was released in 2009. The songs "Para Yok", "Özledim", "Her Şeyi Yak", "Sallana Sallana", "Gümbür Gümbür" and "Buralardan Giderim" from this album were turned into music videos, and Soner Sarıkabadayı appeared in the video for "İki Medeni İnsan". Boz released his second single, "Hayat Sana Güzel", in March 2010. On 12 April 2011, a music video for the lead single from the album Aşklarım Büyük Benden was released. On 9 May 2011, the album itself was released. The songs "Hayat Öpücüğü", "Geri Dönüş Olsa", "Kalamam Arkadaş", "Bulmaca" and "Soyadımsın" from this album were the pieces for which separate music videos were released. Out of these songs, "Geri Dönüş Olsa" and "Kalamam Arkadaş" topped the official music charts inside Turkey. In August 2012, Boz released his first remix album under the title Dance Mix.

Albums

Studio albums

Compilations

EPs

Singles

Duet singles

Other works

Charts

Music videos

Guest appearances

Notes 
 A  Şans sales figures in Turkey as of 1 July 2009.
 B  Aşklarım Büyük Benden sales figures in Turkey as of 31 December 2011.

References

Discographies of Turkish artists
Pop music discographies